"Over Tomorrow" is a song by Australian pop group Pseudo Echo. It was released in February 1989 as the second single from the band's third studio album, Race.  The song peaked at number 40 on the ARIA Charts.

Track listing 
7" (EMI 2198) 
Side A "Over Tomorrow" 
Side B "Wings" 

CD single (CDED 400)
 "Over Tomorrow"	
 "Nothing to Say"
 "Wings"

Charts

References 

1988 songs
RCA Records singles
1989 singles
Pseudo Echo songs